Yelena Makarova (born 1 February 1973) is a Russian breaststroke swimmer. She competed in two events at the 1996 Summer Olympics.

References

External links
 

1973 births
Living people
Russian female breaststroke swimmers
Olympic swimmers of Russia
Swimmers at the 1996 Summer Olympics
Swimmers from Moscow